T. L. Rajkumar is an Indian politician from the state of Arunachal Pradesh. Rajkumar was elected  from Khonsa East constituency seat in the Arunachal Pradesh Legislative Assembly election in 1990, 1995 and 1999 standing as an Indian National Congress candidate. But he lost Khonsa East constituency seat in the 2014 Arunachal Pradesh Legislative Assembly election as a Bharatiya Janata Party candidate to Wanglam Sawin of People's Party of Arunachal.

References 

People from Tirap district
Bharatiya Janata Party politicians from Arunachal Pradesh
Living people
21st-century Indian politicians
Indian National Congress politicians
Year of birth missing (living people)
Arunachal Pradesh MLAs 1990–1995
Arunachal Pradesh MLAs 1995–1999
Arunachal Pradesh MLAs 1999–2004